The men's eight competition at the 1992 Summer Olympics took place at Lake of Banyoles, Spain. It was held from 28 July to 2 August. There were 14 boats (126 competitors) from 14 nations, with each nation limited to a single boat in the event. The event was won by Canada, the nation's second victory (after 1984) to match Great Britain, East Germany, and West Germany for second-most among nations (behind the United States' 11). Romania earned its first medal in the men's eight with silver. A reunited Germany took bronze; West Germany had been the defending champion.

Background

This was the 21st appearance of the event. Rowing had been on the programme in 1896 but was cancelled due to bad weather. The men's eight has been held every time that rowing has been contested, beginning in 1900.

East Germany had been the most successful nation in the men's eight for most of the 1970s and early 1980s; in the latter half of the 1980s, West Germany had risen. The West Germans had won the 1988 Olympics, the 1989 World Rowing Championships, and the 1990 World Rowing Championships; at the 1991 World Rowing Championships, a reunified Germany won again. Germany was thus the favourite in Barcelona. Canada had been the runner-up in the 1990 and 1991 world championships and was the biggest challenger.

The People's Republic of China and South Africa each made their debut in the event; some former Soviet republics competed as the Unified Team. The United States made its 18th appearance, most among nations to that point.

Competition format

The "eight" event featured nine-person boats, with eight rowers and a coxswain. It was a sweep rowing event, with the rowers each having one oar (and thus each rowing on one side). The course used the 2000 metres distance that became the Olympic standard in 1912 (with the exception of 1948). Races were held in up to six lanes.

The competition consisted of three main rounds (heats, semifinals, and finals) as well as a repechage. The 14 boats were divided into three heats for the first round, with 4 or 5 boats in each heat. The top three boats in each heat (9 boats total) advanced directly to the semifinals. The remaining 5 boats were placed in the repechage. The repechage featured a single heat. The top three boats in the repechage advanced to the semifinals. The remaining two boats (4th and 5th place in the repechage) were placed in the "C" final to compete for 13th and 14th places.

The 12 semifinalist boats were divided into two heats of 6 boats each. The top three boats in each semifinal (6 boats total) advanced to the "A" final to compete for medals and 4th through 6th place; the bottom three boats in each semifinal were sent to the "B" final for 7th through 12th.

Schedule

All times are Central European Summer Time (UTC+2)

Results

Quarterfinals

Quarterfinal 1

Quarterfinal 2

Quarterfinal 3

Repechage

Semifinals

Semifinal 1

Semifinal 2

Finals

Final C

Final B

Final A

Final classification

The following rowers took part:

References

Rowing at the 1992 Summer Olympics
Men's events at the 1992 Summer Olympics